Ponka-We Victors (born July 7, 1981, in Ponca and Tohono O'odham) is a community support worker from Wichita, Kansas, who has been a Democratic member of the Kansas House of Representatives, representing District 103, since 2011. She is one of three Native Americans in the Kansas legislature.

Background 
Victors is a member of the Ponca and Tohono O'odham tribes of Native Americans, and a lifelong resident of Wichita. She earned a bachelor's degree in biology from Newman University in 2005, and a Master of Public Administration from Wichita State University in 2008.

Elected office 
Victors, who had worked as a Congressional intern, had been a long-time backer of Delia Garcia, the incumbent Representative from Kansas's 103rd congressional district. In 2010, Garcia supported Victors in filing as the only candidate for the 2010 Democratic primary election hours before the filing deadline. Victors became the presumptive winner of the seat. No Republican candidate has run for the seat since 1998, when incumbent Democrat Thomas Klein polled 57% of the vote in a three-way race. Victors ran unopposed in the November general election.

In 2012, she beat challenger Angela Martinez in the Democratic primary and was again unopposed in the November general election.

"Illegal immigrants" speech 
In 2013, Victors drew national attention when, during a hearing on a bill to deny in-state tuition to Kansas high school graduates who were undocumented immigrants, she addressed Kansas Secretary of State Kris Kobach and other advocates of the bill, saying, "I think it's funny, Mr. Kobach, because when you mention illegal immigrant, I think of all of you."

Career 
Victors is a social worker at Behavioral Link.

References

External links
 Official House website
 Project Vote Smart biography
 Project Vote Smart legislative profile
 Campaign contributions: 2010

1981 births
21st-century American women politicians
American social workers
Living people
Democratic Party members of the Kansas House of Representatives
Native American state legislators
Native American women in politics
Newman University, Wichita alumni
Politicians from Wichita, Kansas
Ponca
Tohono O'odham people
Wichita State University alumni
Women state legislators in Kansas
21st-century Native American women
21st-century Native Americans
20th-century Native Americans
20th-century Native American women
21st-century American politicians